is a Japanese art form in which earth and water are combined and moulded, then carefully polished to create a delicate shiny sphere resembling a billiard ball.

Etymology

Technique

Making the basic dorodango is a traditional pastime for school children.

More recently, the process has been refined into the art of the hikaru ("shining") dorodango, which has a glossy surface. Several different techniques can be used. Across all methods, a core of the ball is made of basic mud, which has been carefully shaped by hand to be as round as possible. This core is left to dry, and then methodically and carefully dusted with finely sifted soil to create a crust several millimeters thick around the core. This step may be repeated several times, with finer and finer grains of dirt in order to create a smooth and shiny surface. A cloth then may be used to gently polish the surface. The dorodango, once completed, may look like a polished stone sphere, but it is still very fragile. The process requires several hours and careful focus so as not to break the ball.

In popular culture
In Christopher Paolini's novel series The Inheritance Cycle, protagonist Eragon witnesses the King of the Dwarves King Orik carrying out a Dwarvish tradition of making an erôthknurl. The process of making an erôthknurl is highly similar to the process of making dorodango. 

In the Discovery Channel series MythBusters episode "End with a Bang" (Episode 113), which first aired on November 12, 2008, hosts Adam Savage and Jamie Hyneman investigated the truth behind everyday sayings. They used the dorodango technique to create dung spheres in order to bust the myth that one "can't polish a turd". Using a glossmeter, they measured gloss levels substantially higher than the value of 70 gloss units, which is considered "high gloss". Savage's 106-gloss unit dorodango used an ostrich's feces, while Hyneman's 183-gloss unit specimen used a lion's feces. They therefore deemed the myth "busted".

In episode 14, "Footsteps", of the anime series Your Lie in April, the character Tsubaki Sawabe polishes a dorodango to show to the protagonist, Kousei, in a flashback sequence. However, it falls apart sometime during the sequence before she can show Kousei, representing her feelings for Kousei in the present day.

In Story of Seasons: Friends of Mineral Town, Popouri gives the main character a dorodango as a gift.

See also
Mud pie

References

External links

"Shiny Mud Balls: Kyoto Professor Taps into the Essence of Play"
Illustrated step-by-step guide to making Hikaru Dorodango
Dorodango: Shining Mud Ball
"Shiny Balls of Mud" - (William Gibson, TATE Magazine)
Bruce Gardner's dorodango (interview)

Children's street culture
Sculpture techniques
Japanese games
Japanese words and phrases